Kursadžije is a popular Serbian TV comedy series, broadcast by RTV Pink. The sitcom is situated in a classroom, where the students come from each republic of the former Yugoslavia.

Students (1 season)

Students (2 season)

Students (3 season)

Teachers
Director Oskar
Professor Labud, Radovan Miljanić
Profesorka muzičkog obrazovanja Maca, Dragana Vujić
Profesorka seksualnog obrazovanja Cuca, Jovana Petronijević
The students are also part of the Jugovizija, where they sing for their respective republic, a parody of the Eurovision Song Contest.

Serbian comedy television series
RTV Pink original programming
Fictional Yugoslav people
Fictional Serbian people
Television shows set in Serbia